The Egg Islands are a small group of three islands west of the Egg Island Channel near Cordova, Alaska.

Islands of Alaska
Islands of Chugach Census Area, Alaska
Islands of Unorganized Borough, Alaska